The Silver Logie for Most Outstanding Factual or Documentary Program is an award presented annually at the Australian TV Week Logie Awards. The award is given to recognise an outstanding Australian factual, observational or documentary program. The winner and nominees of this award are chosen by television industry juries.

It was first awarded at the 7th Annual TV Week Logie Awards ceremony, held in 1965 as Best Documentary Series (1967, 1973-1974, 1976-1986). The award was renamed many times in subsequent ceremonies; Best Documentary (1966, 1969), Best Australian Documentary Series (1970), Best Documentary/Current Affairs Series 
(1971), Best Dramatised Documentary Series (1975). The nominees in the Best Documentary category were either single documentaries or documentary series. This award category was eliminated in 1968 and 1972.

At the 29th Annual TV Week Logie Awards in 1987, the industry voted awards for documentaries was renamed Most Outstanding Single Documentary or Documentary Series until 1993. It has also been known as Most Outstanding Documentary Single or Series (1994-1995), Most Outstanding Documentary (1996–1999, 2001, 2009), and Most Outstanding Documentary or Special Report in a Public Affairs Program (2000), Most Outstanding Documentary Series (2002-2006) and Most Outstanding Documentary or Documentary Series (2007-2008), Most Outstanding Factual Program (2010-2015). This award category was eliminated in 2016 and returned in 2017 as the Most Outstanding Factual or Documentary Program.

Winners and nominees

Listed below are the winners of the award for each year for Best Documentary Series.

Listed below are the winners of the award for each year for Most Outstanding Factual or Documentary Series.

See also
 Logie Award for Most Popular Factual Program

References

External links

Awards established in 1965

1965 establishments in Australia